The Hazelwood Centre is a rugby union ground and sports facility in Sunbury-on-Thames in the English county of Surrey. The facility serves as the home of London Irish with the clubs' administrative offices being based here. The professional side use the facility for training, Premiership Rugby Shield matches and pre-season friendlies. London Irish Amateur Rugby Football Club train and play all home games here.

History and setting
Having replaced the facility at The Avenue, the fields sit in the club's natural green-buffered 63-acre holding.  The previous owner of this parcel of Metropolitan Green Belt was a golf club (supporting its driving range and nine hole-course).  A remnant of its landscaping is a small, professionally-planted pondside reserve.

Facilities

Overview
The site has four full-size grass pitches, one full size synthetic (4G) pitch and twelve junior pitches plus a long clubhouse. The northern end of the clubhouse contains changing facilities for the amateur clubs plus a function room and conference room. The southern end of the clubhouse is used by the professional side and features their changing room, gym and administrative facilities. A shop for amateur team merchandise is within the building.

Wider training use
The facilities have been built to world-class specification and are regularly used by community groups including the GAA. It was also an approved training based for the 2015 Rugby World Cup being used by Wales, Fiji, Argentina and New Zealand.

The New York Jets, Baltimore Ravens, New Orleans Saints, Arizona Cardinals, Philadelphia Eagles and Houston Texans NFL teams also trained here ahead of their NFL London Games in 2015, 2017, 2018 and 2019 respectively with New Orleans returning in 2022. London Irish reciprocated the Jets' agreement by using their facilities ahead of their premiership match in the United States in 2016.

Events
Hospitality, including the bar, is open to local residents for much of the week. Fireworks annually and fundraising events are held during the year, including comedy nights.  On Saturday mornings green verges around the pitches host the local Parkrun. 

Charity Matches dedicated to Matt Ratana take place here with both London Irish and Premiership Rugby sponsoring the event.

References

Sports venues in Surrey
Rugby union stadiums in England